Billardiera heterophylla (formerly Sollya heterophylla) is a species of flowering plant in the family Pittosporaceae, known by the common name bluebell creeper. It is native to Western Australia, but is grown as an ornamental plant in appropriate climates worldwide. It can sometimes be found growing in the wild as an introduced species or garden escapee, for example in other Australian states and in California, where it is popular in landscaping. It is sometimes considered a weed.

Description
It is a climbing shrub with vine-like branches that twine around other plants for support. The inflorescence is a single hanging flower or a hanging group of up to five flowers. The flower has five petals up to 1 cm long which may be white to deep blue or pinkish in color.

Taxonomy
The bluebell creeper was first described by English botanist John Lindley in 1831 as Sollya heterophylla, and was reassigned to the genus, Billardiera by Cayzer, Crisp and Telford in 2004. The specific epithet heterophylla means "with various or diverse leaves". Common names include Australian bluebell and climbing bluebell.

Within the genus, it is closely related to two other Western Australian species - B. fusiformis and B. drummondii.

Distribution and habitat
Billardiera heterophylla is native to the Avon and Eyre districts of southwest Western Australia, where it occurs in open eucalypt forest and woodland and as well as coastal heathland and near salt lakes inland. It is adept at colonising disturbed sites. Its cultivation and propensity to spread have resulted in range increase and difficulties in determining original distribution.

Cultivation and weed status
This plant is a widely cultivated, popular garden plant, and has been available within Australia and internationally for at least 100 years (with seeds being available in Jamaica as early as 1887).
Within Australia, in the temperate regions of Victoria, South Australia and Tasmania it has become a serious environmental weed. It produces an abundance of seed, which readily germinates after fire or disturbance, and is thought also to spread by native animals eating the seed, which not only takes the plant to new sites, but the seed germinates more readily after ingestion.

This plant gained the Royal Horticultural Society's Award of Garden Merit in 2013.

References

heterophylla
Eudicots of Western Australia
Plants described in 1831
Taxa named by John Lindley